Erich Josef Gliebe (born May 23, 1963) is an American former boxer, Neo-Nazi and former chairman of the National Alliance. In his youth, he was a professional boxer who had the ring name of "The Aryan Barbarian".

Biography 
Gliebe's political views were inspired by his father, who served in the German Wehrmacht in World War II. He became active within the National Alliance, a white nationalist, anti-semitic and white supremacist political organization in the United States. As leader of the Cleveland National Alliance Local Unit, he was hired by William Pierce to run the White-power music label Resistance Records after the National Alliance bought full ownership of it in 1999.

After Pierce's death in July 2002, Gliebe was appointed the new Chairman by the Board of Directors. Almost immediately, Gliebe began to alienate members, provoking a backlash within the NA leadership. Gliebe briefly turned the leadership over to Shaun Walker, but resumed the leadership of the National Alliance, after his successor was charged with Civil Rights violations. After resuming the leadership of the organization, Gliebe saw the National Alliance's membership decline precipitously, orchestrated the sale of its Hillsboro, West Virginia property, and halted its operations as a "membership organization".

In April 2009, it was revealed that Gliebe's name was on the list of people banned from entering the United Kingdom.

He is married to Playboy model Erika Gliebe.

Boxing career

Gliebe was undefeated in five professional fights in the light-heavyweight division over a period of three years. His bouts were at venues within West Virginia. Four fights were won by TKO and one fight was won by a split decision.

References

External links

 
 Fall of the Fourth Reich, Scene Magazine
 Lack of Leadership Blamed for Demise of Pro-White Group, American Free Press

1963 births
Living people
American neo-Nazis
American people of German descent
Boxers from Cleveland
American male boxers